The Order of Entrepreneurial Merit is the most junior of the Portuguese civil orders of merit, and is intended to distinguish those who have rendered, as an entrepreneur or worker, outstanding service in promoting appreciation or services in an economic sector. The Order has three classes: Agricultural, Commercial and Industrial. The order was established in 1893 by King Carlos I as the Civil Order of Agricultural and Industrial Merit; the commercial class was added in 1991, and the order given its present name in 2011.<ref>"History: Orders of Entrepreneurial Merit", Ordens Honoríficas Portuguesas" (Office of the President of Portugal; in Portuguese). Retrieved 19 February 2019.</ref>

The following is a list of recipients of the order's highest grade, Grand Cross.Source for the list: "Entidades Nacionais Agraciadas com Ordens Portuguesas", Ordens Honoríficas Portuguesas'' (Office of the President of Portugal). Retrieved 19 February 2019.

Agricultural class

Portuguese recipients

Foreign recipients

Industrial class

Portuguese recipients

Foreign recipients

Commercial class (since 1991)

Portuguese recipients

Foreign recipients

References 

Orders, decorations, and medals of Portugal